Pentacitrotus leechi is a species of moth of the family Tortricidae. It is found in central China and Taiwan.

The wingspan is about 32 mm. The forewings are light pinkish orange, opalescent with lilac. The markings are black, edged with greenish shining scales. The hindwings are bright yellow.

References

Moths described in 1950
Ceracini